The Harbour Baron (German: Der Hafenbaron) is a 1928 German silent film directed by Ernst Winar and starring Colette Brettel, Hans Brausewetter and Eva Speyer.

The film's sets were designed by Carl Ludwig Kirmse.

Cast
 Colette Brettel as Dorrit, eine junge Witwe  
 Hans Brausewetter as Walter Rohde, Offizier Handelsmarine 
 Eva Speyer as Vorsteherin des Waisenheims  
 Vala De Lys as Ilse, Dorrits Freundin  
 John Mylong as Der 'Hafenbaron'  
 Li Hayda as Lu, 'Sekretärin' des Hafenbarons  
 Li Corda as Schwester des Waisenheims  
 Sylvia Torf as Wirtschafterin des Waisenheims  
 Antonie Jaeckel as Frau Gehrts, Walters Tante 
 Art Winkler as Der Wirt  
 Sophie Pagay as Die Wirtin

References

Bibliography
 Gerhard Lamprecht. Deutsche Stummfilme: 1927-1931.

External links

1928 films
Films of the Weimar Republic
German silent feature films
Films directed by Ernst Winar
German black-and-white films